Cyrtodactylus myintkyawthurai, also known commonly as the Mt. Popa bent-toed gecko, is a species of lizard in the family Gekkonidae. The species is endemic to Myanmar.

Etymology
The specific name, myintkyawthurai, is in honor of Burmese herpetologist Myint Kyaw Thura.

Geographic range
C. myintkyawthurai is found in central Myanmar, in Bago Region and Mandalay Region.

Description

Reproduction
The mode of reproduction of C. myintkyawthurai is unknown.

References

Further reading
Grismer LL, Wood PL Jr, Quah ESH, Murdoch ML, Grismer MS, Herr MW, Espinoza RE, Brown RM, Lin AK (2018). "A phylogenetic taxonomy of the Cyrtodactylus peguensis group (Reptilia: Squamata: Gekkonidae) with descriptions of two new species from Myanmar". Peer J 6: e5575. (Cyrtodactylus myintkyawthurai, new species).

Cyrtodactylus
Reptiles described in 2018
Endemic fauna of Myanmar
Reptiles of Myanmar